Frederick F. Faville (June 5, 1865 – February 19, 1954) was a justice of the Iowa Supreme Court from January 1, 1921, to December 31, 1932, appointed from Webster County, Iowa.

References

Justices of the Iowa Supreme Court
1865 births
1954 deaths